A Mobile Trauma Bay is a containerized ambulance bay mounted on an Oshkosh Logistic Vehicle System Replacement (LVSR).
It holds state-of-the-art medical equipment and carries a Shock Trauma Platoon, generally consisting of one doctor, a nurse and three corpsmen, providing advanced resuscitative care to critically injured service members within the first hour after a traumatic injury (the "golden hour").  It takes emergency medical care far forward, saving more lives.  Over 98% of the wounded Marines who make it into the MTB, make it out alive.
The MTB was designed and developed by James L. Hancock in 2008. There were 914 concept drawings over the four-month period from design to deployment.

References

External links 

 CNN profile of a Mobile Trauma Bay

Military medical organizations of the United States
United States Army medical installations